is a Japanese manga series written and illustrated by Yae Utsumi. It was serialized in Kodansha's Manga Box from April 2016 to April 2018 and published in seven volumes.

Publication
Written and illustrated by Yae Utsumi, the series began serialization on the Manga Box manga website on April 30, 2016. The series completed its serialization in April 2018. Kodansha collected the series' individual chapters into seven tankōbon volumes.

In October 2017, Kodansha USA announced that they licensed the series for English publication.

Volume list

Reception
Ashitaka from Manga Sanctuary felt that although the story was nothing new, it was still enjoyable, though they also criticized the story for lacking action and suspense at times. Faustine Lillaz from Planete BD felt that it had some exaggerated reactions and disjointed narration, though she offered praise for the artwork.

References

External links
 

Horror anime and manga
Japanese webcomics
Kodansha manga
Shōnen manga
Thriller anime and manga
Webcomics in print